Peter Stryker Cooke (born March 7, 1949) is an American businessman, politician and retired Army Reservist. In 2012, he was the Democratic nominee for Governor of Utah.

Early life
Cooke was born in Miami, Florida. Cooke's father was a pilot for Pan American Airlines and his family traveled frequently.  Cooke graduated from Frankfurt American High School in 1967. Cooke moved to Utah from Germany to attend the Utah State University (USU) forestry program. Instead, however, Cooke earned a bachelor's degree in 1971 and a master's degree in 1973 from USU in political science. During his time at USU, Cooke was a member of the Army Reserve Officer Training Corps (ROTC).

Career

After graduating from USU, Cooke served in the United States Army Reserves. In 2009 he was awarded the Army Community of Excellence Award. After 39 years in the military, he retired with the rank of major general. He served as commander of the 96th (reserve) Regional Readiness Command before his retirement.

Cooke ran for a congressional bid in 1978, but was not elected. Under Governor Scott M. Matheson, Cooke served as the director of economic development for Utah. In 2012 Cooke declared his candidacy for Governor of Utah.

Cooke was called as Mission President for the Washington DC North Mission for three years starting in June 2013.

References

External links

 

1949 births
Latter Day Saints from Florida
Living people
United States Army reservists
Utah Democrats
Utah State University alumni
Latter Day Saints from Utah
Candidates in the 2012 United States elections